Local elections were held in the province of Pampanga on May 13, 2013, as part of the 2013 general election.  Voters will select candidates for all local positions: a town mayor, vice mayor and town councilors, as well as members of the Sangguniang Panlalawigan, the vice-governor, governor and representatives for the four districts of Pampanga.

Gubernatorial election
Parties are as stated in their certificate of candidacies.

Incumbent Governor Lilia Pineda is running for her reelection under to her local party KAMBILAN (a coalition composed of National Unity Party, Lakas–CMD, Nationalist People's Coalition and United Nationalist Alliance), her running mate is her son Dennis Pineda. Governor Lilia will face again former governor Ed Panlilio of Liberal Party, his running mate is lawyer Maria Amalia Tiglao.

Vice-gubernatorial election

Congressional Election

1st District
Incumbent Carmelo Lazatin is not running instead he is running for mayor of Angeles City, Lakas–CMD thru the local party KAMBILAN nominates basketball coach and incumbent Vice-Governor Yeng Guiao. he will face former Congressman Francis Nepomuceno.

2nd District
Incumbent Gloria Macapagal Arroyo is running despite of her sickness and in hospital arrest.

3rd District
Aurelio Gonzales, Jr. is the incumbent. he will facing-off incumbent San Fernando City Mayor Oscar Rodriguez.

4th District
Incumbent Anna York Bondoc is term limited; her brother Juan Pablo Bondoc is her party's nominee.

Sangguniang Panlalawigan Election

1st District
City: Angeles City, Mabalacat City
Municipalities: Magalang

|-
|bgcolor=black colspan=5|

|-

|-

2nd District
Municipalities: Floridablanca, Guagua, Lubao, Porac, Santa Rita, Sasmuan

|-
|bgcolor=black colspan=5|

|-

|-

3rd District
City: San Fernando City
Municipalities: Arayat, Bacolor, Mexico, Santa Ana

|-
|bgcolor=black colspan=5|

|-

|-

4th District
Municipalities: Apalit, Candaba, Macabebe, Masantol, Minalin, San Luis, San Simon, Santo Tomas

|-
|bgcolor=black colspan=5|

|-

|-

City and Municipal Election

1st District
City: Angeles City, Mabalacat City
Municipalities: Magalang

Angeles

Mabalacat City

Magalang

2nd District
Municipalities: Floridablanca, Guagua, Lubao, Porac, Santa Rita, Sasmuan

Floridablanca

Guagua

Lubao

Porac

Santa Rita

Sasmuan

3rd District
City: San Fernando City
Municipalities: Arayat, Bacolor, Mexico, Santa Ana

San Fernando City

Arayat

Bacolor

Mexico

Santa Ana

4th District
Municipalities: Apalit, Candaba, Macabebe, Masantol, Minalin, San Luis, San Simon, Santo Tomas

Apalit

Candaba

Macabebe

Masantol

Minalin

San Luis

San Simon

Santo Tomas

2013 Philippine local elections
Elections in Pampanga